The La Plata River is the longest river in Puerto Rico. It is located in the north coast of the island. The mouth of the river is a resort area with white sandy beaches.

It crosses the municipalities of Guayama, Cayey, Comerío, Naranjito, Toa Alta, Toa Baja, and Dorado forming two lakes in its path: Carite Lake and La Plata Lake.

There are many crossings of the river. The Arenas Bridge, in Cayey, is one of the most notable. It is a steel bridge built in 1894 and is still in use. It was the longest bridge built in Puerto Rico by the Spanish. Another notable bridge that passes over the river is the Jesús Izcoa Moure bridge, a cable-stayed bridge which straddles the city borders of Naranjito, Toa Alta and Bayamon.

The United States Army Corps of Engineers is undertaking a major flood control project in the river basin.

History

It is popularly said that Taíno Indians referred to the river as "thoa" which means mother, which itself gave the name to the towns of Toa Alta and Toa Baja located in the mouth of the river to the Atlantic Ocean.

Cultural references
The river is referenced on the anthem of the town of Toa Baja.

Hurricane Maria
The river, which runs through the heart of Comerio, rose more than 11 feet on September 20, 2017 (Hurricane Maria) causing major flooding and irreparable destruction to areas along the river. It destroyed the school, the police station, countless homes and businesses in Comerio, and other municipalities along the river.

Flood control project
In mid 2018, the United States Army Corps of Engineers announced it would be undertaking a major flood control project of the river basin, with a $500 million budget. By mid 2019, a project by the USACE to mitigate the flooding risk to Toa Baja by The Plata River had not yet begun.

Gallery

See also

 Arenas Bridge: NRHP-listed bridge over the river
 La Liendre Bridge: NRHP-listed bridge over a tributary
 Plata Bridge: NRHP-listed bridge over the river
 List of rivers in Puerto Rico

References

External links

 USGS Hydrologic Unit Map – Caribbean Region (1974)
 Rio de la Plata, Puerto Rico Flood Control Project - U.S. Army Corps of Engineers

Rivers of Puerto Rico
Cayey, Puerto Rico
Guayama metropolitan area